Methylobacterium ajmalii is a species of Methylobacterium.

In March 2021, a new species, named Methylobacterium ajmalii, associated with three new strains, designated IF7SW-B2T, IIF1SW-B5, and IIF4SW-B5, was reported to have been discovered, for the first time, on the International Space Station

References 

Hyphomicrobiales
Bacteria described in 2021